Ahmad ibn Muzahim ibn Khaqan was the military governor (wālī al-jaysh) of Egypt for the Abbasid dynasty for a part of 868.

Career
The son of Muzahim ibn Khaqan, Ahmad succeeded his father as governor following the latter's death. After holding the post for only two months, however, Ahmad died himself of unspecified causes. Azjur al-Turki, who had served as chief of police under both Muzahim and Ahmad, then became governor.

References

Sources
 
 
 

868 deaths
Abbasid governors of Egypt
Year of birth unknown
9th-century Turkic people
9th-century Abbasid governors of Egypt